The chemokine (C-X-C motif) ligand 1 (CXCL1) is a small peptide belonging to the CXC chemokine family that acts as a chemoattractant for several immune cells, especially neutrophils or other non-hematopoietic cells to the site of injury or infection and plays an important role in regulation of immune and inflammatory responses. It was previously called GRO1 oncogene, GROα, neutrophil-activating protein 3 (NAP-3) and melanoma growth stimulating activity, alpha (MGSA-α). CXCL1 was first cloned from a cDNA library of genes induced by platelet-derived growth factor (PDGF) stimulation of BALB/c-3T3 murine embryonic fibroblasts and named "KC" for its location in the nitrocellulose colony hybridization assay. This designation is sometimes erroneously believed to be an acronym and defined as "keratinocytes-derived chemokine". Rat CXCL1 was first reported when NRK-52E (normal rat kidney-52E) cells were stimulated with interleukin-1β (IL-1β) and lipopolysaccharide (LPS) to generate a cytokine that was chemotactic for rat neutrophils, cytokine-induced neutrophil chemoattractant (CINC). In humans, this protein is encoded by the gene Cxcl1  and is located on human chromosome 4 among genes for other CXC chemokines.

Structure and expression 
CXCL1 exists as both monomer and dimer and both forms are able to bind chemokine receptor CXCR2. However, CXCL1 chemokine is able to dimerize only at higher (micromolar) concentrations and its concentrations are only nanomolar or picomolar upon normal conditions, which means that the form of WT CXCL1 is more likely monomeric while dimeric CXCL1 is present only during infection or injury. CXCL1 monomer consists of three antiparallel β-strands followed by C- terminal α-helix and this α-helix together with the first β-strand are involved in forming a dimeric globular structure.

Upon normal conditions, CXCL1 is not expressed constitutively. It's produced by a variety of immune cells such as macrophages, neutrophils and epithelial cells, or Th17 population. Moreover, its expression can be also induced indirectly by IL-1, TNF-α or IL-17 produced again by Th17 cells  and is triggered mainly by activation of NF-κB or C/EBPβ signaling pathways predominantly involved in inflammation and leading to production of other inflammatory cytokines.

Function 
CXCL1 has a potentially similar role as interleukin-8 (IL-8/CXCL8). After binding to its receptor CXCR2, CXCL1 activates phosphatidylinositol-4,5-bisphosphate 3-kinase-γ (PI3Kγ)/Akt, MAP kinases such as ERK1/ERK2 or phospholipase-β (PLCβ) signaling pathways. CXCL1 is expressed at higher levels during inflammatory responses thus contributing to the process of inflammation. CXCL1 is also involved in the processes of wound healing and tumorigenesis.

Role in cancer 
CXCL1 has a role in angiogenesis and arteriogenesis  and thus has been shown to act in the process of tumor progression. The role of CXCL1 was described by several studies in the development of various tumors, such as breast cancer, gastric and colorectal carcinoma or lung cancer. Also, CXCL1 is secreted by human melanoma cells, has mitogenic properties and is implicated in melanoma pathogenesis.

Role in nervous system and sensitization 
CXCL1 plays a role in spinal cord development by inhibiting the migration of oligodendrocyte precursors. CXCR2 receptor for CXCL1 is expressed in the brain and spinal cord by neurons and oligodendrocytes and during CNS pathologies such as Alzheimer's disease, multiple sclerosis and brain injury also by microglia. An initial study in mice showed evidence that CXCL1 decreased the severity of multiple sclerosis and may offer a neuro-protective function. On the other hand, on the periphery, CXCL1 contributes to the release of prostaglandins and thus causes increased sensitivity to pain and drives nociceptive sensitization via recruitment of neutrophils to the tissue. Phosphorylation of ERK1/ERK2 kinases and activation of NMDA receptors leads to transcription of genes inducing chronic pain, such as c-Fos or cyclooxygenase-2 (COX-2).

References

External links 
 

Cytokines